Belmaneh may refer to:
 Belmaneh-ye Olya
 Belmaneh-ye Sofla